Myrothecium is a genus of fungi in the order Hypocreales and is now placed in the family Stachybotryaceae.

Species
The Catalogue of Life lists:
 Myrothecium atroviride
 Myrothecium bisetosum
 Myrothecium carmichaelii
 Myrothecium cinctum
 Myrothecium inundatum (type species)
 Myrothecium lachastrae
 Myrothecium masonii
 Myrothecium prestonii
 Myrothecium roridum
 Myrothecium setiramosum
 Myrothecium tongaense
 Myrothecium verrucaria

References

External links
 
 

Hypocreales genera
Stachybotryaceae